The Environmental Performance Index (EPI) is a method of quantifying and numerically marking the environmental performance of a state's policies. This index was developed from the Pilot Environmental Performance Index, first published in 2002, and designed to supplement the environmental targets set forth in the United Nations Millennium Development Goals.

The EPI was preceded by the Environmental Sustainability Index (ESI), published between 1999 and 2005. Both indices were developed by Yale University (Yale Center for Environmental Law and Policy) and Columbia University (Center for International Earth Science Information Network) in collaboration with the World Economic Forum and the Joint Research Centre of the European Commission. The ESI was developed to evaluate environmental sustainability relative to the paths of other countries. Due to a shift in focus by the teams developing the ESI, the EPI uses outcome-oriented indicators, then working as a benchmark index that can be more easily used by policy makers, environmental scientists, advocates and the general public. Other leading indices like the Global Green Economy Index (GGEI) provide an integrated measure of the environmental, social and economic dynamics of national economies. The GGEI utilizes EPI data for the environmental dimension of the index while also providing a performance assessment of efficiency sectors (e.g. transport, buildings, energy), investment, green innovation and national leadership around climate change.

The EPI for the year 2022 ranks 180 countries. The top five countries are Denmark, United Kingdom, Finland, Malta and Sweden. India ranked last at 180 with a score of 18.9.

Methodology 
EPI calculation variables change often as can be seen below.  This should be taken into account when observing country performance through several reports, as it can lead to score and ranking changes founded just on methodology modification. Apart from variables addressing environmental health and ecosystem vitality, the calculation also takes into account other variables such as rule of law, control of corruption and government effectiveness.

2020 variables

2018 variables 
The variables in 2018 are largely similar to those from 2016, but have changed in details and some weights.
Notably environmental Health is now weighted at 40% and ecosystem vitality at 60%.

EPI scores

2020 
The Environmental Performance Index for the year 2020 ranks 180 countries.

Top 100 countries and score

2018

EPI report archive 
Below is a list of links to the official archive of past reports
2016 EPI full report regional rankings and scores (pages 111 - 114) 
2014 EPI full report regional rankings and scores (pages 121 - 123)
2010 EPI summary rankings and scores are on page 6. Includes pilot tend EPI
2010 EPI summary rankings and scores are on page 6
 2008 EPI summary includes rankings and scores
 2006 EPI pilot summary rankings and scores are on page 6

Criticisms
The methodology for the EPI has been criticized for its arbitrary choice of metrics which could introduce bias, and its poor performance as an indicator for environmental sustainability. Additional criticisms center on the EPI's lack of specific policy suggestions, and the index's weighting biases against data deficient countries that has led to the overlooking of ecological progress in developing countries. Below is a quote from the abstract:

Jordan spent 2001–2006 in a node represented by lower life expectancy due to particulate matter emissions (PME), but, from 2007 to 2010, the country shifted to a node with a lower PME magnitude—indicating a positive shift in overall environmental sustainability. By following the EPI ranking, the policymakers in Jordan may have assumed that their decisions between 2006 and 2008 led to a deterioration in environmental sustainability, when, in fact, the inconsistent nature of the weighting process involved in the EPI rankings is a likely cause...

In 2022, India was ranked last in the list and rejected the low ranking. As per a statement issued by the Ministry of Environment, Forests and Climate Change (MoEF&CC), it claimed that several indicators used in the calculation were based on unfounded assumptions and unscientific methods.

See also
Environmental Vulnerability Index (EVI)
Consumer product labeling

References

External links
Yale University – EPI – A collaboration between Yale and Columbia Universities
Yale University – YCELP – Yale Center for Environmental Law & Policy
2018 Environmental Performance Index

International rankings
Sustainability metrics and indices